Ximena Caminos is a Cultural Entrepreneur and Cultural Place Maker. Chair of BlueLab Preservation Society, CCO of HoneyLab Creative and Founder of The ReefLine.

She is also the Artistic Visionary Planner for The Underline, the largest public art project in the country. She is founder and former Chair of Faena Art, and was formally Executive Creative Director and partner in Faena Group. She was also Chief Curator of the Faena Arts Center in Buenos Aires from 2004. Caminos founded the Faena Prize for the Arts (see: Faena Arts Center), one of the largest art prizes in Latin America. Formally Artistic Director of Faena Forum, "a new kind of multidisciplinary centre in a flexible building that can house dance, theatre, political debates, lectures and a wide range of other cultural happenings," opened in Miami Beach in 2016 and designed by Rem Koolhaas In 2019, Caminos specializes in curating large, site specific public art installations,  like Leandro Erlich's Order of Importance, Art Basel 2019.

She has been cited as a major contributor to the international contemporary arts scene.  Caminos is a member of the New Museum Leadership Council, founding Member of the Solomon R. Guggenheim Museum's Latin American Circle Partner, and Advisor to Art Basel Cities. She is an XPrize Ambassador and the recipient of many Awards, amongst them the Knight Foundation Arts Champion Award and Knight Foundation Arts Challenge Award 2019.

Currently, Ximena Caminos is leading an interdisciplinary team of experts on the realization and production of the ReefLine, a 7 – 9 mile public underwater sculpture park and artificial reef off the coast of Miami Beach, FL.  Each reef module will be designed by artists and scientifically informed.

Early career

Caminos was a curator at the Museo de Arte Latinoamericano de Buenos Aires until 2004, and previously, a curator and producer for the Buenos Aires Secretary of Culture She trained with Eduardo Stupía and Pablo Suarez and worked with Miguel Briante at the Recoleta Cultural Center

References

Argentine business executives
Living people
Women business executives
Year of birth missing (living people)
Argentine women in business